In Greek mythology, Cres (Ancient Greek: Κρής Kres, gen. Κρητός) was a possible eponym of the island Crete. Stephanus of Byzantium distinguishes between two figures of this name: one was a son of Zeus and the nymph Idaea, and the other a Cretan autochthon who became the first ruler of Crete. According to Cinaethon of Sparta, Cres was the father of Talos.

Mythology 
The autochthonous Cres is mentioned in other accounts as the native king of a whole earth-born nation, the Eteocretans ("true Cretans"), and the inventor of a number of items that were crucial for the development of the human civilization. He was said to be one of the Curetes.

According to a tradition recorded by Stephanus, it was during Cres' reign that Tectaphus, son of Dorus, migrated to Crete from Thessaly, followed by Dorian and Achaean tribes, as well as by those of the Pelasgians that had not migrated to Tyrrhenia. A daughter of Cres (or Cretheus) was married by the foreigner and bore him a son Asterion who later became the husband of Europa and adopted father of her sons by Zeus.

Several authors identified Cres as one of the Curetes, possibly their king, and therefore a caretaker of the young Zeus who was hidden by him in a cave on Crete.

See also
Crete (mythology)

Notes

References 

 Diodorus Siculus, The Library of History translated by Charles Henry Oldfather. Twelve volumes. Loeb Classical Library. Cambridge, Massachusetts: Harvard University Press; London: William Heinemann, Ltd. 1989. Vol. 3. Books 4.59–8. Online version at Bill Thayer's Web Site
 Diodorus Siculus, Bibliotheca Historica. Vol 1-2. Immanel Bekker. Ludwig Dindorf. Friedrich Vogel. in aedibus B. G. Teubneri. Leipzig. 1888–1890. Greek text available at the Perseus Digital Library.
 Pausanias, Description of Greece with an English Translation by W.H.S. Jones, Litt.D., and H.A. Ormerod, M.A., in 4 Volumes. Cambridge, MA, Harvard University Press; London, William Heinemann Ltd. 1918. . Online version at the Perseus Digital Library
 Pausanias, Graeciae Descriptio. 3 vols. Leipzig, Teubner. 1903.  Greek text available at the Perseus Digital Library.
 Stephanus of Byzantium, Stephani Byzantii Ethnicorum quae supersunt, edited by August Meineike (1790-1870), published 1849. A few entries from this important ancient handbook of place names have been translated by Brady Kiesling. Online version at the Topos Text Project.

Autochthons of classical mythology
Children of Zeus
Demigods in classical mythology
Cretan characters in Greek mythology